Bordj Bou Arréridj population 140,000 (2005 estimate), is the capital city of Bordj Bou Arréridj Province, Algeria.  It is situated 148 miles by road east of Algiers, near the Hodna Massif in the southern Kabylie Mountains, at an elevation of 916 metres.

The economy is largely based upon agriculture and forestry, with some small-scale industries.  Bordj Bou Arréridj is well-connected to other urban centres by road and rail. The cities of Setif and Bouira are 70 km east and 115 km northwest, respectively.  CA Bordj Bou Arreridj (CABBA) is a 1st Level Algerian professional football club based in town; its home grounds are 20 August 1955 Stadium in Mohamed Belouizdad.

Economy 
The city is considered highly innovative for presence of many high-tech. The city is home to a number of technology companies. The city is home to the headquarters of Condor Electronics.

Sports 
Bordj Bou Arréridj has a team in the Algerian Ligue Professionnelle 1: CA Bordj Bou Arréridj, founded in 1931.
They also have two teams in the Algerian Basketball Championship:  IRB Bordj Bou Arréridj and OS Bordj Bou Arréridj.

Notes

Populated places in Bordj Bou Arréridj Province
Cities in Algeria
Province seats of Algeria